Václav Drobný (9 September 1980 – 28 December 2012) was a Czech footballer who notably played for Sparta Prague having spent time in their youth team as well as spells at Czech, Slovak, French and German sides. Drobný played twice for the Czech Republic and was most known in England for his short stint on loan at Aston Villa.

Career

Club career
Drobný played for FK Jablonec nad Nisou 97 (on loan from Sparta) during the first half of the 2005–06 season, RC Strasbourg, Chmel Blšany and Sparta Prague. He also spent the 2004–05 season on loan at English team Aston Villa, in the Premier League. The move was not a success for the defender however, who left having failed to make a single first team appearance for the claret and blue.

Drobný left Strasbourg in 2005 to join Sparta Prague, before having spells at Jablonec 97, Augsburg and FC Spartak Trnava. He was released by the latter in 2009. However, the following year Drobný signed for Bohemians Praha. The defender made his debut for the club in a 3–2 victory away at Slovan Liberec on 20 March 2010. He played eighty minutes for his new club before being replaced by Martin Horacek.

International career
Drobný was part of the Czech side which won the UEFA U-21 Championships in 2002, and debuted for the senior team against Japan – though he failed to secure a spot in Euro 2004. The defender won two international caps.

Death
Drobný died while bobsleighing at the ski resort Špindlerův Mlýn. He skidded off-piste and crashed into a tree.

References

External links
 
 

1980 births
2012 deaths
Accidental deaths in the Czech Republic
Czech expatriate footballers
Czech footballers
Czech Republic youth international footballers
Czech Republic under-21 international footballers
Czech Republic international footballers
Expatriate footballers in France
Expatriate footballers in Germany
Expatriate footballers in England
Czech First League players
Ligue 1 players
2. Bundesliga players
RC Strasbourg Alsace players
Aston Villa F.C. players
FK Chmel Blšany players
FK Jablonec players
AC Sparta Prague players
FC Augsburg players
Association football defenders
People from Mělník
Sportspeople from the Central Bohemian Region